Ewen, Ewan or Euan Henderson may refer to:

Ewen Henderson (artist), artist
Ewen Henderson (musician), fiddler and bagpiper
Euan Henderson (snooker player)
Euan Henderson (footballer) (born 2000), Scottish football forward (Heart of Midlothian FC)
Ewan Henderson (footballer) (born 2000), Scottish football defender (Celtic FC)